Matthew Thomas Davies (born 7 February 1995) is a professional footballer who plays as a right-back for Malaysia Super League club Johor Darul Ta'zim and the Malaysia national team. He started his professional career with Perth Glory at 18 years old. After playing for two seasons at Perth Glory Davies went on to Sri Pahang in 2015 in the Malaysia Super League, after his first season Davies was given captaincy for Sri Pahang at age 21 years old, making him the youngest captain ever for Sri Pahang and the first half Malaysian to become captain in the Malaysia Super League.

Davies has also made several appearances for the Malaysian national team, he was given his first international debut with caretaker coach Ong Kim Swee against Saudi Arabia during the World Cup qualifiers in September 2015 at 20 years old. Davies also featured for Malaysia at the 2015 SEA Games in Singapore back in June 2015.

Early life 
Born in Perth, Davies grew up playing football from a young age, stating previously that his brothers' participation in the sport encouraged him to play. Davies grew up as an Australian though his mother, who hails from Sabah, Malaysia, giving him the ability to attain Malaysian citizenship.

Davies moved to Malaysia when he was 20 years old due to his impatient nature in search of international football. "I left Australia because I'm impatient in nature ... I wanted playing time and I knew I wasn’t going to get much by staying in Australia", he said. "The opportunity to play international football for the country my mother was born in was too good to refuse. There are not many A-League regulars in the Socceroos".

Club career 
Davies started his career with the A.I.S in 2010. He captained the squad and was awarded player of the year and voted players player during his 2011/2012 NYL season with the AIS. Previously to this he was a product of the National Training Centre (NTC) programs in Western Australia.

Perth Glory 
Davies signed for Perth Glory and played in the National Youth League for Perth Glory FC Youth. In 2013–2014 season, Davies was promoted to the senior squad after signing a two-year contract with the club. He went on to make his senior debut against Melbourne City on 27 October 2013. He spent two years with Perth Glory accumulating 16 senior appearances.

Sri Pahang 
In April 2015, Davies signed with Malaysia Super League club, Sri Pahang during the April transfer window. He was signed as a local player based on his Malaysian heritage. He made his league debut in a 2-0 away win against Kelantan on 11 April 2015. In February 2016, Davies became captain of the Malaysia Super League team, Sri Pahang shortly after the season had started. He is the youngest player ever to be given captaincy at just 21 years old and the first half-Malaysian to be given the honour in the Malaysia Super League, as he is half Australian and Malaysian.

Matthew Davies captained Sri Pahang to victory in 2018, becoming the Malaysian FA cup winners. Davies became the youngest captain in the history of the competition to lift the FA cup at just 23 years of age. The year before Davies narrowly missed the opportunity to obtain the credential at 22 years old after losing to Kedah Darul Aman.

On 15 February 2020, two weeks before the start of 2020 Malaysia Super League season, Davies officially left Sri Pahang after five seasons with the club.

Johor Darul Ta’zim 
Davies joined Johor Darul Ta'zim prior to the 2020 Malaysia Super League season. It was not a surprise Johor snatched Davies after his success in both rival team Sri Pahang and the Malaysia national football team. Johor Darul Ta'zim owner Tunku Ismail Idris stated, “We have been keeping a close watch on him for the last three to four years but we decided to let him get experience with Sri Pahang before joining Johor Darul Ta'zim.
“It's a great investment because he is just 25 years old and it’s a long term investment for JDT to improve the team.
“We are grateful that there is a player who has a professional attitude and quality in our team.”

International career

Australia U19 
Davies was selected for the U19 Young Socceroos squad to represent Australia at the COTIF Tournament in L'Alcúdia, Spain from 12 to 21 August in 2013.

Malaysia

Under-23 
An Australian by birth, he chose to represent Malaysia at the national level. He was eligible by virtue of his mother who was born in the Malaysian state of Sabah. He made his international debut for Malaysia's under-23 team at the 2015 Southeast Asian Games playing 4 out of 5 Group games. Malaysia finished third in their group and were unsuccessful in qualifying for the semifinal.

Senior 
Davies is a regular for the national team, consistently being called up since his citizenship. He has only missed call ups due to injury. He debuted for the Malaysian national team on the 8th of September in a World Cup Qualifying game against Saudi Arabia in a 1–2 loss. He's since made numerous appearances for the Malaysian national team including representing Malaysia at the 2016 AFF Championship.

Career statistics

Club 

Notes

International

Honours

Club 
Sri Pahang
 Malaysia FA Cup: 2018, runner-up 2017

Johor Darul Ta'zim

 Malaysia Cup: 2022
 Malaysia Super League: 2020, 2021, 2022
 Piala Sumbangsih: 2020, 2021, 2022, 2023
 Malaysia FA Cup: 2022

Individual 
FAM Football Awards
 Best Young Players: 2015/16
 Best Defender of the Year: 2017 
 Best Defender of the Year: 2021

International 
Malaysia U-23
 Southeast Asian Games
 Silver Medal: 2017

References

External links 
 
 
 
 Matthew Davies profile at Ultimateleague.com

1995 births
Living people
Australian soccer players
Australian people of Malaysian descent
Association football defenders
Malaysian people of Malay descent
Perth Glory FC players
A-League Men players
National Premier Leagues players
Malaysian footballers
Malaysian expatriate footballers
Malaysia international footballers
Malaysian people of Australian descent
Sri Pahang FC players
Johor Darul Ta'zim F.C. players
Malaysia Super League players
Soccer players from Perth, Western Australia
People who lost Australian citizenship
Citizens of Malaysia through descent
Australian emigrants to Malaysia
Southeast Asian Games silver medalists for Malaysia
Southeast Asian Games medalists in football
Competitors at the 2017 Southeast Asian Games